Mazama
is an unincorporated community in Okanogan County (population 158) located in the Methow Valley of Washington, on the east slopes of the North Cascades and North Cascades National Park.

Founded around the beginning of the twentieth century,
Mazama boomed as the departure point for mining towns in the rugged Harts Pass area, such as Barron, Chancellor, and Robinson.
Recently considered little more than a pit-stop, Mazama "town" is centered at the intersection of Lost River Road and Country Road 9140. Mazama offers a general store, an adventure supply store, a gas station, a café, and two restaurants. It has been a destination for summer weddings, rock climbing, mountaineering, and winter sports with options for heli-skiing, back-country and cross country skiing.

Etymology
In the 19th century, the town was called "Goat Creek", after a creek at the base of nearby Goat Peak (then called Goat Mountain). When the former post office was secured in 1899, the settlers chose a name they thought was Greek for "mountain goat". They later discovered that they had looked in the wrong dictionary and, according to Edmond S. Meany, the meaning of "Mazama" was not "mountain goat" in Greek.

According to toponymist William Bright the name "Mazama" originally came from the Nahuatl word mazame, "deer (plural)", from mazatl, "a deer", referring to brocket deer. In the past the word was used locally to refer to mountain goats or bighorn mountain sheep. In 1896 the word was used in the naming of the Portland mountaineering club, The Mazamas.

Ecology 

The Methow River flows immediately to the south of Mazama, where it provides spawning habitat to spring Chinook salmon.

Forests of native Douglas-fir and Ponderosa pine are widespread in Mazama and its surroundings, with ample Cottonwood along creeks and rivers.

Over seventy species of mammals are indigenous to the area. This includes the Northern pocket gopher, but ironically, not the Mazama pocket gopher.

Climate
Mazama has a humid continental climate (Köppen Dsb) with warm, dry summers, and cold, snowy winters.  It lies immediately leeward of the North Cascades, which trap much of the precipitation carried from the Pacific Ocean by prevailing westerly winds.  This rain shadow strengthens with increasing distance from the Cascade crest: semi-arid Winthrop.  Winthrop, approximately 14 miles further down-valley, receives a little over half the annual precipitation of Mazama.  Mazama’s relatively heavy snowfall, along with the brief hours of winter daylight in a deep mountain valley, inspired the first settlers to nickname the area "Early Winters."

Washington’s record cold temperature was measured in both Mazama and Winthrop:  on December 30, 1968.

The average seasonal snowfall for the Mazama area is 119.7 inches,
with an average of 136 days per year having at least 1 inch of snow on the ground.
The greatest snow depth at any one time during the period of record, 62 inches, 
was recorded on January 1, 1997.

Geology

Soils are characteristically Leiko
stony ashy sandy loam. Rock types in surrounding areas include Cretaceous Andesite, and Quaternary Alluvium which is mostly in the valley.

Activities

The Mazama area offers cross-country skiing, snowshoeing, hiking, rock climbing, and mountaineering.

In the 1970s and 1980s, various proposals to build a ski resort on Sandy Butte near Mazama were submitted to the United States Forest Service amid opposition from local residents. It was planned to accommodate up to 8,200 skiers and cost $25 million to construct. The final iteration of the proposal, named Arrowleaf Resort, was withdrawn in 1999 following a ruling by the Washington State Department of Ecology that denied water rights for the project.

References

External links

Unincorporated communities in Okanogan County, Washington
Unincorporated communities in Washington (state)
Populated places in the Okanagan Country
Washington placenames of Native American origin